Kuhestan Rural District is in Qaleh Chay District of Ajab Shir County, East Azerbaijan province, Iran. At the census of 2006, its population was 9,810 in 2,211 households; there were 9,190 inhabitants in 2,406 households at the following census of 2011; and in the most recent census of 2016, the population of the rural district was 9,468 in 2,728 households. The largest of its eight villages was Hargalan, with 3,371 people.

References 

Ajab Shir County

Rural Districts of East Azerbaijan Province

Populated places in East Azerbaijan Province

Populated places in Ajab Shir County